China Minsheng Trust Co., Ltd. is a Chinese trust and investment management company. The company formerly known as China Tourism International Trust Investment Co., Ltd. founded in 1994.

History
China Tourism International Trust Investment Co., Ltd. was founded in 1994. In 1999, the stake (30.85%) held by China National Tourism Administration was transferred to Beijing Tourism Group.

In 2003, most of the assets and branches were acquired by Century Securities. However, China Tourism Trust was allowed to keep the license.

On 16 April 2013, the company was re-established as China Minsheng Trust Co., Ltd. China Oceanwide Holdings Group was the largest shareholder for 69.3%, Beijing Tourism Group for 30%, CYTS Group (the parent company of China CYTS Tours Holding) for 0.4%, China Railway Travel Service for 0.2% stake and China Comfort Travel Group for 0.1% stake.

In 2016, Oceanwide Holdings subscribed  nominal value of stock of the company (plus share premium ), as well as acquired the stake held by the parent company China Oceanwide Holdings Group.

In September the company acquired the license to manage foreign assets. In December the trust acquired the license to enter futures market.

See also
 Minsheng Securities sister company

References

External links
  

China Oceanwide Holdings Group
Companies based in Beijing
Financial services companies of China
Private equity firms of China
Chinese companies established in 1994
Financial services companies established in 1994
Privatization in China